As of July 2020, Alitalia operates to 26 domestic and 88 international  scheduled destinations. This list includes both Alitalia and Alitalia CityLiner destinations, excluding charter routes. To see the destinations of Alitalia's successor ITA Airways, go to List of ITA Airways destinations.

Destinations

References 

Alitalia
Alitalia